Alibek Alikovich Bashkayev (also Alibek Bashkaev, ; born November 16, 1989) is a Russian judoka, who played for the half-middleweight category. He won two gold medals for his division at the 2006 World Junior Judo Championships in Santo Domingo, Dominican Republic, and at the 2008 World Junior Judo Championships in Bangkok, Thailand.

Bashkaev represented Russia at the 2008 Summer Olympics in Beijing, where he competed for the men's half-middleweight class (81 kg). He received a bye for the second preliminary round, before losing out by an ippon and a sumi gaeshi (corner reversal) to Morocco's Safouane Attaf.

References

External links
 
 
 
 NBC Olympics Profile

1989 births
Living people
People from Rostov Oblast
Russian male judoka
Olympic judoka of Russia
Judoka at the 2008 Summer Olympics
Universiade medalists in judo
Universiade silver medalists for Russia
Medalists at the 2009 Summer Universiade
Sportspeople from Rostov Oblast
21st-century Russian people